Xəlfəlikənd (also, Khalfalikend and Khalifa) is a village in the Lerik Rayon of Azerbaijan.  The village forms part of the municipality of Mistan.

References 

Populated places in Lerik District